This is a list of professional and alternative format snooker tournaments. Professional snooker tournaments can take the form of ranking tournaments—which are open to players on the main tour and award ranking points based on a player's performance—and non-ranking tournaments.  A non-ranking tournament may take the form of an invitational event where player participation is conditional on criteria set by the organiser or sponsor or by personal invite. Most tournaments take the form of a 'singles' event, but there are several team formats that have appeared on the calendar over the years.

In recent seasons alternative forms of snooker have proliferated on the calendar. Any event that uses the official rules of snooker but is not completely consistent with them is defined as an "alternative form of snooker", such as six-red snooker (which is played with six reds as opposed to the standard fifteen as required by the official rules), and alterations to scoring and fouling.

Current tournaments

Ranking

This is a list of ranking professional snooker tournaments.

Non-ranking

The professional snooker tournaments listed below are non-ranking and invitational events.

Pro-am

Withdrawn tournaments

Ranking
This is a list of ranking professional snooker tournaments that no longer form part of the snooker calendar.

Minor-ranking

This is a list of minor-ranking professional snooker tournaments that no longer form part of the snooker calendar.

Non-ranking
The professional snooker tournaments listed below were non-ranking and invitational events.

Pro-am

Secondary professional tour

Alternative forms of snooker

See also

List of snooker players by number of ranking titles
Snooker amateur competitions

References

 Snooker tournaments at Chris Turner's Snooker Archive
 Snooker tournaments at Snooker.org

 
Tournaments